The 2016 Idol Star Athletics Ssireum Futsal Archery Championships (Hangul: 아이돌스타 육상 씨름 풋살 양궁 선수권대회) was held at Goyang Gymnasium in Goyang, South Korea on January 18 and 19 and was broadcast on MBC on February 9 and 10, 2016. At the championships, a total number of 9 events (4 in athletics, 2 in ssireum, 2 in archery and 1 in futsal) were contested: 4 by men, 4 by women and 1 mixed. There were around 180 K-pop singers and celebrities who participated, divided into seven teams.

Cast

Main
Team Beat to the end: BTS, Got7, Twice, Bestie
Team Veteran: 4Minute, Beast, Apink, Roh Ji-hoon, BtoB, CLC
Team Star Wars: Exo, AOA, B.A.P, Red Velvet, Lovelyz, N.Flying
Team Yeo-vengers: Girl's Day, Nine Muses, Dal Shabet, EXID, Mamamoo, Minx, Sonamoo, GFriend
Team Nom Nom Nom: Teen Top, VIXX, Myname, A-JAX, 100%, Yoo Seung-woo, Madtown
Team Secret Weapon: Melody Day, Uniq, NU'EST, Big Star, A.cian, The Legend
Team Overnight puppy: Monsta X, Seventeen, UP10TION, Snuper, Oh My Girl, April, DIA, Imfact

Results

Men 

Athletics

Ssireum

Futsal

Women 

Athletics

Ssireum

Archery

Mixed 

Archery

Ratings

References

External links 

 2016 Idol Star Athletics Ssireum Futsal Archery Championships

MBC TV original programming
South Korean variety television shows
South Korean game shows
2016 in South Korean television
Idol Star Athletics Championships